Walden Ridge (or Walden's Ridge) is a mountain ridge and escarpment located in Tennessee, in the United States. It marks the eastern edge of the Cumberland Plateau and is generally considered part of it. Sometimes Walden Ridge is called the Cumberland Escarpment.

Geology
Sequatchie Valley, a long valley in the Cumberland Plateau, is located just west of the southern part of Walden Ridge. Being part of the Cumberland Plateau, Walden Ridge is also part of the Appalachian Plateau physiographic province. The Sequatchie River runs through the valley. To the east of Walden Ridge are the Ridge-and-valley Appalachians and the Tennessee River. Geologically, Walden Ridge continues south in Georgia and Alabama as Sand Mountain. Walden Ridge originally extended across the present path of the Tennessee River to Sand Mountain, but was eroded when the Tennessee River Gorge was formed.

History
The section of Walden Ridge that is visible from the Chattanooga area is often colloquially referred to as "Signal Mountain" due to the presence of the small town of Signal Mountain, Tennessee nearby, the proliferation of broadcasting towers on its eastern edge, and the area's use by early nineteenth century Native Americans (and later Civil War soldiers) as a signal point toward Lookout Mountain south across the Tennessee River.

According to the USGS, variant names of Walden Ridge include Waldens Ridge, Walldenns Ridge, Wallens Ridge, Walden's Ridge, and Walden Ridge Plateau.

References

External links
Peakbagger Walden Ridge
Walden Ridge and Sequatchie Valley – Tennessee Encyclopedia of History and Culture

Escarpments of the United States
Ridges of Tennessee
Landforms of Hamilton County, Tennessee